Anyone for Mozart? (released as Swinging Mozart in France) is the third album released by the Swingle Singers.  The album was a 1965 Grammy award winner for "Best Performance by a Chorus."

All tracks from this album are also included on the CD re-issue / compilation, Anyone for Mozart, Bach, Handel, Vivaldi? and on the 11 disk Philips boxed set, Swingle Singers.

Track listing 
all compositions by (W.A. Mozart)
 "Variations (12) on Ah, vous dirai-je maman for piano in C major" K. 265 (K. 300e) – 5:49
 "Sonata for violin & piano No. 29 in A major" (fragment), K. 402 (K. 385) – 2:54
 "Piano Sonata No. 15 in C major" ("Sonata semplice") K. 545 ~ Allegro – 2:11
 "Piano Sonata No. 15 in C major" ("Sonata semplice") K. 545 ~ Andante – 2:41
 "Piano Sonata No. 15 in C major" ("Sonata semplice") K. 545 ~ Allegretto – 1:25
 "Serenade No. 13 for strings in G major" ("Eine kleine Nachtmusik") K. 525 ~ Allegro – 3:24
 "Serenade No. 13 for strings in G major" ("Eine kleine Nachtmusik") K. 525 ~ Romance – 2:47
 "Serenade No. 13 for strings in G major" ("Eine kleine Nachtmusik") K. 525 ~ Menuetto – 1:23
 "Serenade No. 13 for strings in G major" ("Eine kleine Nachtmusik") K. 525 ~ Rondo – 2:44
 "Piano Sonata No. 5 in G major" K. 283 (K. 189h) ~ Allegro – 2:51

Personnel 
Vocals:
 Jeanette Baucomont – soprano
 Christiane Legrand – soprano
 Alice Herald – alto
 Anne Germain – alto
 Ward Swingle – tenor, arranger
 Claude Germain – tenor
 Jean Cussac – bass
 José Germain – bass
Rhythm section:
 Guy Pedersen – double bass
 Daniel Humair – drums

References / external links 
 Philips PHM 200-149 (Mono LP) / Philips PHS 600-149 (Stereo LP) / Philips 548538 (CD) / Philips PTC 600149 (Reel)
 Swinging Mozart at [ allmusic.com]

The Swingle Singers albums
1965 albums
Philips Records albums
Grammy Award for Best Performance by a Chorus